Wijesinghe is a Sinhalese name. Notable people with the name include:
Given name
Wijesinghe Lokubandara (born 1941), Sri Lankan politician
Surname
Athula Wijesinghe, former Chief Minister of North Western Province
Chanaka Wijesinghe (born 1982), Sri Lankan cricketer
Chandrasena Wijesinghe, Sri Lankan politician
Gamini Wijesinghe, former Auditor General of Sri Lanka
H. J. Wijesinghe, Ceylonese educationist
Mallory Evan Wijesinghe (1918–2002), Sri Lankan engineer and entrepreneur
Mellony Wijesinghe (2002–2019), Sri Lankan netball player
Nimal Wijesinghe (born 1969), Sri Lankan politician
Rathna Sri Wijesinghe (born 1953), Sri Lankan lyricist
Samara Wijesinghe (1943–2015), Sri Lanka engineer, author, poet and blogger
Sarath Wijesinghe, Sri Lankan politician
Sirimal Wijesinghe, Sri Lankan author, political analyst, film director, journalist, and alternative intellectual
Tharinda Wijesinghe (born 1997), Sri Lankan cricketer
Theodore Godfrey Wijesinghe Jayewardene (1872–1945), Ceylonese engineer
Thilan Wijesinghe, Sri Lankan financier, entrepreneur, former cricketer and musician

See also
Wijesinha

Sinhalese surnames